The Texas A&M University College of Agriculture and Life Sciences (AgLifeSciences) is a college of Texas A&M University, a public land-grant research university in College Station, Texas. It is one of ten colleges and schools that are part of the university. Agriculture and the Life Sciences have been part of the university since its founding in 1876 as the "Agricultural & Mechanical College of Texas." The college was formally recognized in 1911. A part of the land grant university system, the college offers more than 80 undergrad and grad degree programs across 14 departments. It is also one of the five organizations that comprise Texas A&M AgriLife.

Academics and enrollment
The college employs nearly 400 faculty members across 14 departments, with over 300 of those being full-time faculty. Those departments include: Agricultural Economics; Agricultural Leadership, Education & Communications; Animal Science; Biochemistry/Biophysics; Biological and Agricultural Engineering; Ecosystem Science and Management; Entomology; Horticultural Sciences; Nutrition and Food Sciences; Plant Pathology and Microbiology; Poultry Science; Recreation, Park and Tourism Sciences; Soil and Crop Sciences; and Wildlife and Fisheries Sciences. 31 degrees are available to undergraduate students, with all degrees being Bachelor of Science degrees, except within the horticulture department, which also offers a Bachelor of Arts degree. It offers 45 master's-level degree programs and 27 doctoral-level programs (including 9 interdisciplinary degrees).

In 2008, 6691 students were enrolled in the college, with 5425 of those being undergraduate enrollments. According to the 2008 FAEIS survey released by the USDA, A&M has the largest enrollment among the 234 agricultural colleges and land-grant universities for which USDA receives such data. The college has an 1,800 acre farm with live stock and crops.

Notable faculty
The college faculty has included several professors who have been awarded national and international honors.

Active faculty
 Max Summers: elected to the National Academy of Sciences in 1989
 Edward Hiler: elected to the National Academy of Engineering in 1987
 Douglas Starr: Pulitzer Prize
 Fuller Bazer: Humboldt Prize, Wolf Prize in Agriculture

Former faculty
 Norman Borlaug: 1970 Nobel Peace Prize, National Academy of Sciences in 1968, 1977 U.S. Presidential Medal of Freedom, 2002 Public Welfare Medal from the U.S. National Academy of Sciences, the 2002 Rotary International Award for World Understanding and Peace, 2004 National Medal of Science

References

External links
Official website

Agriculture and Life Sciences
Agricultural universities and colleges in the United States
College Station, Texas
Educational institutions established in 1911
1911 establishments in Texas